WEPA-CD, virtual channel 59 (UHF digital channel 16), was a low-powered, Class A Cozi TV-affiliated television station licensed to Pittsburgh, Pennsylvania, United States. The station was owned by OTA Broadcasting. The simulcast network gave it coverage similar to or greater than that of full-power television stations in that market. The stations were founded and owned by Bruno-Goodworth Network, Inc. until sold on August 26, 2013 for $7.25 million to OTA Broadcasting, LLC (a company controlled by Michael Dell's MSD Capital). After the sale, WEPA-CD became an affiliate of Cozi TV, Movies! and Retro TV. Because of the coverage it had, WEPA was one of the few Class A stations in the country that is "reportable" by Nielsen Media Research . However, on April 13, 2017, FCC announced that it had accepted OTA Broadcasting's bids totalling $73.9 million to sell the spectrum rights of WEPA-CD and four other Pittsburgh-area stations owned by OTA Broadcasting  in the FCC spectrum incentive auction. By October 25, 2017, OTA Broadcasting ceased transmissions and surrendered to the FCC for cancellation the licenses of WEPA-CD and five other Pittsburgh-area stations (including one whose spectrum had not been sold), and also temporarily shut transmissions of its five remaining Pittsburgh-area stations, which did not provide adequate over-the-air coverage in Pittsburgh itself and closer suburbs. Movies! has since moved to WOSC-CD, another Pittsburgh television station.

History

As WBGN-CD
WEPA-CD began broadcasting in 1995 on channel 59 with the call sign W59BT, and later WBGN (WBGN-LP in 1998, WBGN-LD in 2009, and WBGN-CD in 2010) until November 2014. As WBGN-CD, the station broadcast a variety of programming including first run syndicated shows such as Martha, Reno 911!, Chappelle's Show, Degrassi: The Next Generation, Temptation and Jury Duty, along with former network hits such as Family Ties, Hawaii Five-O, Mission: Impossible, The Nanny, Mad About You, The Outer Limits, and America's Funniest Home Videos. The prime-time lineup was rounded out with programming syndicated from Canada such as Cold Squad, Stone Undercover and ReGenesis. The network also showed second-run movies, children's shows such as Beakman's World, live religious broadcasts and real estate shows. The station produced and/or aired a number of regularly scheduled local programs. It broadcast local news breaks and local high school and professional sporting events. In 2005, the station broadcast The It's Alive Show, a local program showcasing horror films and B-movies. In May 2006, the station also produced two-minute news and 30-second weather segments which aired every half hour during prime-time hours. In 2013, WBGN-CD also started airing a professional wrestling show called PWX Unleashed from local McKeesport promotion Pro Wrestling eXpress. This is PWX's second TV show since their TV show which was held at Eastland Mall (North Versailles, Pennsylvania).

Digital conversion
On July 12, 2009, WBGN-LD began broadcasting digitally in the Pittsburgh area on physical channel 16, the former analog designation of WINP-TV.

The station and its satellite stations signed off their analog signals on June 22, 2010, since many fell within the channel 52-Channel 69 spectrum that was freed up for other uses by the FCC. Like the main signal, the digital signal in New Castle aired on a former analog designation, in this case channel 27, the former analog home of CBS affiliate WKBN-TV in Youngstown, Ohio as did the digital signal in Greensburg which aired on the former analog designation of CW affiliate WPCW Pittsburgh/Jeannette, PA. By July 2010, WBGN-CD, becoming Class-A, and most of its satellite stations including New Castle (WPCP-CD), Butler (WNNB-CD), Beaver (WJMB-CD), and Greensburg (WEMW-CD) were transmitting digitally.

Station sale
On August 26, 2013, Bruno-Goodworth Network, Inc. completed the sale of all 11 of their stations to OTA Broadcasting, LLC for $7.25 million.

During late 2014, the station moved its operations to 4802 Fifth Avenue, Pittsburgh PA, and became a full-time affiliate of Movies!, Cozi TV, and Retro Television Network. The only remaining local programs are a daily noon mass from St. Mary's Church in downtown Pittsburgh, The Weird Paul Variety Show, Cappelli & Company, Pro Wrestling Express, and The It's Alive Show. On November 20, 2014, OTA Broadcasting changed the call sign on the station from WBGN-CD to WEPA-CD because the previous call sign was a direct reference to the station's previous owners.

Spectrum sale
On April 13, 2017, the FCC announced that five of OTA Broadcasting's Pittsburgh-area stations — WEMW-CD, WEPA-CD, WNNB-CD, WPCP-CD, and WVTX-CD — were successful bidders in the spectrum auction and would be relinquishing their spectrum; WEMW's spectrum was sold for $12,394,400, WEPA's spectrum was sold for $20,093,644, WNNB's spectrum went for $19,185,317, WPCP received $16,162,391 for its spectrum, and WVTX's spectrum went for $6,100,391. At the time, all five stations indicated they would enter into post-auction channel sharing agreements. WEMW-CD ceased operations July 20, 2017; OTA Broadcasting surrendered its license to the FCC for cancellation on July 21, 2017. WEPA-CD, WNNB-CD, WPCP-CD, WVTX-CD, and another station whose spectrum had not been sold, WJPW-CD, ceased transmissions October 25, 2017 and surrendered their licenses on October 26.

On July 21, 2017, at the time of WEMW-CD's shutdown, WEPA-CD's station manager told the press that WEPA-CD, WNNB-CD, WPCP-CD, and WVTX-CD would later also be shut down, but, after that, WEPA-CD programming would continue to be broadcast by OTA Broadcasting's other Pittsburgh-area stations and carried on Verizon's FiOS, revealing no technical or commercial hurdles. However, on October 24, 2017, the same manager informed the press that, without WEPA-CD's signal to retransmit, the company's remaining Pittsburgh-area stations would also need to go off-air, and that the company would be seeking alternatives to bring them back in some form in the future. Before the shutdown, those remaining stations provided over-the-air coverage only to exurbs located south/southwest and north/northeast of Pittsburgh. Movies! has since moved to WOSC-CD virtual subchannel 61.2 (RF channel 26 transmitting from WQED's antenna tower, where WEPA-CD's antenna was also located). In November 2017, OTA agreed to sell the remaining stations — WKHU-CD, WMVH-CD, WWKH-CD, WWLM-CD, and WJMB-CD — to HC2 Holdings for $275,000.

Stations

Before the shutdown, WEPA-CD provided three standard definition channels.

See also

WJPW-CD Weirton, WV
WVTX-CD Bridgeport, OH

References

External links

Television stations in Pittsburgh
Cozi TV affiliates
Movies! affiliates
Retro TV affiliates
Low-power television stations in the United States
1989 establishments in Pennsylvania
Television channels and stations established in 1989
Television channels and stations disestablished in 2017
2017 disestablishments in Pennsylvania
Defunct television stations in the United States
EPA-CD